Corruption in Azerbaijan is considered high and occurs at all levels of government. In Transparency International's 2022 Corruption Perceptions Index, which ranked 180 countries from those perceived to be least corrupt (which received low rankings) to those perceived to be very corrupt (which received high rankings), Azerbaijan was ranked 128, compared to 45 for Georgia and 58 for Armenia. In the Azerbaijani laundromat money-laundering scheme, $2.9 billion was paid to foreign politicians and Azerbaijani elites by companies linked to Azerbaijani ruler Ilham Aliyev, government ministries, and the International Bank of Azerbaijan between 2012 and 2014. Azerbaijan is a member of Group of States Against Corruption (GRECO) and OECD's Anti-Corruption Network.

International anti-corruption indices and reports 

In Transparency International's 2017 Corruption Perceptions Index (CPI), Azerbaijan achieved its best position since its inclusion in the report in 2000, with a score of 31. In the years 2018-2022 its scores were lower, with a 2022 score of 23.

According to Transparency International's 2015 report, Azerbaijan demonstrated improvement in international anti-corruption reports from previous years; however, its position in these indices was weak compared to that of neighbouring countries, such as Georgia, Armenia, and Turkey.  This weakness continues into the present; in the 2022 CPI results, Azerbaijan's score of 23 showed that it is perceived to be more corrupt than its neighbors, Georgia (56), Armenia (46), Russia (28) and Iran (25).

The World Bank’s Worldwide Governance Indicators reported that Azerbaijan's ability to control corruption increased to 20 (2015) from 7 (2000).

The 2013 Global Corruption Barometer (GCB) report of Transparency International indicated that 9% of respondents in Azerbaijan thought that corruption had increased a lot. While 69% considered that the government's efforts were effective in the fight against corruption. Furthermore, 71% of respondents agreed that an ordinary person can make a difference in the fight against corruption in Azerbaijan. Citizens' participation and the values of integrity, accountability, and transparency were crucial components of fighting corruption. It was important to develop programs and actions to change the cultural understanding of corruption and helped citizens to act against abuses.

In the 2013 GCB report, health, the judiciary, and police were perceived as the most corrupt sectors by respondents. In comparison to the 2010 GCB report, improvement was noted in the more recent report with increased levels of trust in the civil service, education, and police. Contrary to international perceptions, Azerbaijani respondents perceived political parties as one of the least corrupt sectors alongside the media and religious bodies

The 2014 National Integrity Assessment report of the Azerbaijani National Chapter of Transparency International characterized Azerbaijan as having a strong executive branch, and law enforcement and anti-corruption agencies while the report indicates that the judiciary and legislative branches of governance are comparatively weak, with the pillars that perform watchdog functions, including civil society, the media, and political parties, being the weakest links in the national integrity system.

According to the Global Integrity Index (GIX) (2011), the anti-corruption legislative framework of Azerbaijan is strong (89 out of 100); however, its implementation is very weak (38 out of 100) considering the powers that have been granted by law.

Azerbaijan has improved its anti-corruption legislation to bring it into line with the standards of international conventions. However, it lacks the supporting legislative Acts and institutional measures to apply it in practice, thus creating a disparity between the existing legislation and its application.

Azerbaijan is a member of the Council of Europe's Group of States against Corruption (GRECO) and has passed its first, second and third evaluation rounds. In GRECO's fourth evaluation round report, even though serious anti-corruption efforts have been carried out by the Azerbaijani government to fight against corruption, corruption is still being referred to as one of the most problematic areas in the country In addition, the GRECO report notes that the lack of control on ancillary activities and asset disclosure of Members of Parliament weakens the anti-corruption framework: the report recommends that anti-corruption efforts be deepened and institutionalized in the field of asset declaration and conflicts of interest.

Azerbaijan has signed the Istanbul Anti-Corruption Action Plan (Istanbul Action Plan, or IAP) which covers Armenia, Azerbaijan, Georgia, Kazakhstan, Kyrgyzstan, Mongolia, Tajikistan, Ukraine, and Uzbekistan and the other ACN countries in 2003. The Implementation of the plan includes regular and systematic peer review of the legal, and institutional framework for fighting corruption in the covered countries by the signing parties. Since then Azerbaijan has actively taken part in the monitoring rounds.

A 2014 report by Transparency International concluded that Azerbaijan was demonstrating steady improvement in anti-corruption rankings, but its progress was relatively slower than that of neighbouring countries. Furthermore, Azerbaijan had advanced with its anti-corruption legislation and strong executive branch; however, the legislature and the judiciary were perceived as weak and potentially more exposed to corruption.

In March 2017, the authorities of Azerbaijan authorised publication of the Fourth Round Compliance Report on Azerbaijan by GRECO.

Political context and background timeline of corruption issues 
After the dissolution of the Soviet Union in late 1991, the transition period in Azerbaijan was complicated and further prolonged by the inability of the national political elite to ensure the existence of key public institutions during 1991–1993. In addition, during those years, Azerbaijan was forced to engage in military clashes with Armenia over the region of Nagorno-Karabakh. In 1993, as a result of the invasion by Armenia, Azerbaijan lost 20% of its territory. In the same year, the United Nations Security Council adopted four resolutions (822, 853, 874 and 884) which condemned the use of force against Azerbaijan and the occupation of its territories. The UN Security Council demanded from Armenia the immediate, complete and unconditional withdrawal of the occupying forces.

As a result of the war with Armenia, the influx of more than one million refugees and internally displaced people had a devastating impact on both the social and economic situation in Azerbaijan (Badalov and Mehdi, 2004). This tragic event shifted the priority of the country from building public institutions to accommodating internally displaced people (IDPs) and providing them with the necessary living standards. In addition, the collapse of the Soviet Union caused economic paralysis in Azerbaijan. Therefore, the main priorities of the Azerbaijani government were to divert all of its financial and political resources to safeguarding IDPs and to fighting against the invasion by Armenia in the international legal arena.

First indicator of anti-corruption political will 
Following a period of state building after 1993, adoption of the new Constitution and with Azerbaijan's increasing economic power, President Heydar Aliyev identified four key reform areas comprising: (i) re-organization of state institutions; (ii) adoption of clear and transparent regulations for civil service recruitment; (iii) creation of various anti-corruption preventive and judicial institutions; and (iv) establishment of an anti-corruption policy. President Aliyev next signed the decree on “Strengthening the fight against corruption in the Republic of Azerbaijan” on 8 August 2000, which is considered to be the first indicator of the commitment of political will to the fight against corruption in Azerbaijan. The document clearly indicates that despite reforms having been carried out in the field of fighting against economic crimes, corruption and bribery continued to be widespread in public administration and financial regulatory bodies

The document also shows that some public officials were misusing their powers to embezzle state property. Furthermore, it stated that legal violations in the private sector and financial regulatory bodies were the main impediments to the establishment of a safe market economy, entrepreneurship and foreign direct investments (FDIs). This anti-corruption decree shows that the fight against corruption came to the state policy agenda almost one decade after the year of independence, and that the main reason behind this document was to attract foreign investment. Another important aspect of this decree is that it assigned tasks to relevant authorities to prepare the draft law and the State Program on Combating Corruption.

Institutional arrangements and coordination mechanisms

Commission on Combating Corruption 
Commission on Combating Corruption is set up according to the article 4.2 of the Law of the Republic of Azerbaijan on "Fight Against Corruption" and functions as a specialized agency on combating corruption since 2005. Commission is composed of 15 members. 5 members of the commission are appointed by the President of the Republic, 5 by the Parliament and the 5 by the Constitutional Court. The statute of it approved by the Law of Azerbaijan Republic dated May 3, 2005 defines the authorities of the commission.

The commission's main objectives are:
 to take part in formation of state policy in the area of combating corruption
 to coordinate the activities of public institutions in this area
 to supervise the implementation of the State Program on Combating Corruption
 to analyse the state and efficiency of the struggle against corruption
 to receive financial declarations envisaged in Section 5.1 of the law “On Combating Corruption"
 to collect, analyse and summarize information regarding corruption related law violations
 to make proposals to the appropriate public institutions
 to cooperate with public and other institutions in the field of combating corruption
 to receive complaints and applications from individuals
Commission in order to reach its objectives, shall vested with followings:
 to study and generalize the state of execution of the anti-corruption legislation and to hear the reports and information provided by the heads of the law enforcement and other state bodies;
 to receive from state and local administrative bodies necessary information and materials;
 to receive information on the state of the implementation of the State Program on Combating Corruption from the corresponding state bodies and analyses the state of the implemented works;
 to prepare recommendations and proposals for increasing the efficiency of the combating corruption and elimination of the shortcomings in the field of combating corruption and take measures for their implementation;
 to take measures for organization of public awareness in the area of combating corruption and conduction of public surveys
 to cooperate with NGO's, mass-media, private sector representatives', independent experts and in case of necessity to involve them for the execution of certain tasks;
 to take part in international cooperation for increasing the efficiency and organization of the struggle against corruption;
 to send the materials for examination to the competent authority, shall it contain the constitutive elements of the corruption related offences,
 to make proposals for the improvement of the anti-corruption legislation;
The Commission shall have other authorities provided by the legislation.

The Commission on Combating Corruption (CCC) is the main organization and government body which is responsible for policies and prevention measures to fight against corruption. CCC is also responsible for making progress and action plans according to the requirements of the international organizations Azerbaijan has joined with the purpose of eliminating corruption. Azerbaijan has also adopted National Action Plan for 2016–2018 on Promotion of Open Government (hereinafter Action Plan) which addresses anti-corruption, through public consultations with the help of proposals of several NGOs.

The Executive secretaries of CCC were Inam Karimov, Vusal Huseynov and Kamal Jafarov.

Anti-Corruption General Directorate 
The Anti-Corruption (bribery) General Directorate with the Prosecutor General of the Republic of Azerbaijan was established by the Order of the President of the Republic of Azerbaijan No.114 dated March 3, 2004. Directorate General is a body specialized in the field of preliminary investigation conducted on the corruption crimes, and is subordinated to the Prosecutor General of the Republic of Azerbaijan.

Main responsibilities of the Directorate include: consideration and investigation of complaints received in relation to corruption offenses; to institute criminal proceedings and conduct a preliminary investigation of corruption crimes; carry out operational-search activities to prevent, detect and disclose corruption crimes; on the basis of orders of the Directorate to oversee the implementation of laws during the implementation of operational-search measures on corruption crimes by other bodies of operational and search activities; compensation for material damage caused as a result of corruption offenses as well as to implement legal measures to enable confiscation of property; get acquainted with measures on fight against corruption; collect, analyze and summarize information on offenses relating to corruption; to enhance the effectiveness of the fight against corruption make proposals and recommendations; ensure the implementation of safety measures of witnesses, victims, defendants and others involved in criminal proceedings during the preliminary investigation of corruption crimes, as well as during the trial of these crimes; via the Prosecutor General to regularly inform the President of the Republic of Azerbaijan and the commission for combating corruption about the measures undertaken in the field of fight against corruption; cooperate with the government and other authorities in the field of fighting corruption; to inform the public on their activities, to ensure transparency in its activities, etc.

Civil Service Commission 
Corrupt practices, including nepotism and cronyism, were widespread in civil service recruitment in Azerbaijan until 2005. Azerbaijan did not have the necessary legislative and institutional basis to prevent corruption in one of the most important sectors of public administration. The widespread practice used in the recruitment of personnel was based on recommendations and bribes. In addition, Azerbaijan did not have a merit-based recruitment system and the Chief Executives of the executive bodies had wide discretion in appointing any personnel. In 2005, the Civil Service Commission (CSC) was established by Presidential Decree, with the commission legally authorized to conduct civil service recruitment and to place candidates in state positions in a centralized manner based on competition and objective evaluation (OECD Istanbul Anti-corruption Action Plan, 2016). Furthermore, the CSC has powers to audit the ethics compliance of civil servants and to implement state policy on supplementary education, attestation and the social protection of civil servants.

The CSC has reduced the risk of corruption and has prevented the use of personal affiliations in the civil service recruitment system. Some loopholes are still present in the recruitment system: the OECD Anti-Corruption Network has pointed out that new preventive regulations should also cover the recruitment of high-level civil servants.

ASAN Service 
Issues of corruption in public service delivery were one of the problematic areas within the public sector. Citizens faced administrative burdens and bureaucratic barriers in obtaining basic public services. In some situations, citizens were extorted to pay bribes to obtain public services. To eliminate corruption in public service delivery, a new preventive institution, namely the Azerbaijan service assessment network (ASAN) (asan means “easy” in the Azerbaijani) was established by Presidential Decree in 2012. Currently, this institution provides 34 services for 10 state bodies. It was the first one-stop-shop service delivery model in the world to provide the services of various state bodies rather than only the services of one state body.

No conflict of interest exists between ASAN service employees and Azerbaijani citizens as ASAN service employees do not provide any kind of service themselves. All services are provided by the employees of the 10 state bodies under one roof, based on the standards of the ASAN service. Employees of the ASAN service monitor the work of the state bodies, check for compliance with ethics rules and manage the queue system.

Monitoring report by OECD has praised Azerbaijan "for advancing Azerbaijani Service and Assessment Network (ASAN) centers, which has contributed to eliminating the conditions that are conducive to corruption when delivering various administrative services to the public". Azerbaijan 2016 report by EEAS acknowledged ASAN services have been a great help in the elimination of corruption and bribery, as well as removing bureaucracy in public service delivery.

A similar institution is planned to be established in Afghanistan as well. A Memorandum of Understanding was signed between the State Agency for Public Service and Social Innovations under the President of the Republic of Azerbaijan and Ministry of Finance of the Republic of Afghanistan on July 12, 2016. The aim of the Memorandum is to establish a public service delivery mechanism in Afghanistan based on Azerbaijani model “ASAN service”.

Judicial-Legal Council (JLC) 
The Judicial-Legal Council (JLC), established in 2005, is an independent body and has organizational and financial independence. It is financed from the state budget and its prospective year's budget cannot be less than the previous year's budget. The JLC has 15 members, nine of whom are judges, while five are from the Prosecutor General's Office and the Bar Association of the Republic of Azerbaijan, and one member is from the executive body. The JLC has the competence to carry out the selection of candidate judges and to undertake evaluation, promotion and transfer of judges. Those members of the JLC who are not judges are also granted immunity.

The JLC has the authority to bring judges to account in terms of disciplinary liability; to discuss the issue of terminating the term of judges; and to propose this course of action to the relevant state body. Furthermore, the JLC has the right to endorse the Prosecutor General's Office to initiate criminal proceedings against judges and to temporarily suspend them from their position. The JLC also analyzes the activities of judges and the organization of the courts; submits proposals regarding the improvement of legislation related to courts and judges; and arranges specialized courses, and relevant seminars and training to raise the level of professionalism of judges. The JLC convenes the Judges’ Selection Committee which has the right to select candidates for vacant judicial posts. This committee is composed of 11 members, who include judges, JLC staff, representatives of the respective executive body and the Prosecutor General's Office, defence lawyers and academics.

Legal framework for the work of the anti-corruption 
The main anti-corruption law, the Law of 2004 on Combating Corruption, which defines the directions of the fight against corruption, was adopted on 13 January 2004. This law, which consists of the following four chapters, defines the main principles and framework for fighting against corruption: (i) general provisions; (ii) prevention of corruption; (iii) criminalization of corruption; and (iv) removal of the proceeds of corruption offences.

This law explained the notion of corruption; introduced a list of corruption offences (stipulating that these offences will give rise to civil, administrative and criminal liability); identified specialized anti-corruption agencies (ACAs); and regulated the general rules on asset declarations, the rule of restrictions on gifts and the prohibition on working together for those who are next of kin.

In 2006, a new chapter on corruption offences was added to the Azerbaijani Criminal Code. It is important to note that this existing criminal legislation fully addresses the requirements of UNCAC's Article 15 (Bribery of national public officials); Article 16 (Bribery of foreign public officials and officials of public international organizations); and Article 21 (Bribery in the private sector), which together criminalize the active and passive bribery of national/foreign public officials as well as persons carrying out organizational-administrative or administrative-economic functions in commercial and non-commercial organizations.

UNCAC's Article 17 (Embezzlement, misappropriation or other diversion of property by a public official) and Article 22 (Embezzlement of property in the private sector) are criminalized in the Azerbaijani Criminal Code along with Article 178 (Fraud) and Article 179 (Misappropriation and embezzlement of property). Even though public officials are not specified as the subject of Articles 178 and 179, an aggravating condition for both criminal offences is commission of the offence by any person through the use of his/her service position, with this including public officials and people working in the private sector (E-qanun.az, 2016).

UNCAC's Article 18 (Trading in influence) and Article 19 (Abuse of power) are not mandatory provisions, but both active/passive trading in influence and abuse of power were criminalized in the Azerbaijani Criminal Code with Article 308 (Abuse of power) and Article 312-1 (Trading in influence).

Illicit enrichment, UNCAC non-mandatory requirement, is not criminalized in Azerbaijan's national legislation. Very few states have introduced this corruption offence to their criminal legislation: different controversies about this issue include the point that a reversal of the burden of proof is used in illicit enrichment (Dionisie and Checchi, 2007). To elaborate, in illicit enrichment, public officials are obliged to explain the source of a significant increase in his/her assets and financial situation. It is important to note that the reversal of the burden of proof is contrary to the principles of the presumption of innocence and the protection of property, as laid down in the European Convention on Human Rights (Huseynov, 2014).

In addition, the Azerbaijani Criminal Code criminalizes the laundering of the proceeds of crime and its concealment: this legislation fully complies with the mandatory obligation arising from UNCAC's Article 23 (Laundering of proceeds of crime) and Article 24 (Concealment). Article 193-1 of the Criminal Code includes two crimes on money laundering. Firstly, the Criminal Code criminalizes the concealment of the real source, disposition, movement or ownership of the rights to money resources and other property, knowing that they have been obtained through illegal acts. Secondly, the Criminal Code criminalizes the carrying out of financial operations, the conversion or the transfer of proceeds of crime.

The Criminal Code provides for the criminal liability of legal persons with criminal charges incurring the following: sanctions, confiscation, depriving a legal person of the right to engage in certain activities, or liquidation of a legal entity. Even though Azerbaijan's national domestic legislation on the criminal liability of legal persons is advanced, it is not functional as no specific procedures on the criminal liability of legal persons have been adopted in the Criminal Procedure Code. The Criminal Code is not self-executing law: each liability or measure in the Criminal Code has to be regulated with the Criminal Procedure Code.

Azerbaijan's national domestic legislation complies with the requirements of UNCAC's Article 29 (Statute of limitations). Article 75 of the Azerbaijani Criminal Code indicates that a person shall be released from criminal liability if the following time limits have expired since the commission of the act: 
 two years after the commission of a crime not representing big public danger
 seven years after the commission of a less-grave crime 
 twelve (12) years after the commission of a grave crime
 twenty (20) years after the commission of an especially grave crime. 
The Criminal Code specifies that the limitation period is to be counted from the day the crime is committed to the time the court verdict is entered. If a new crime is committed, the limitation period for each crime should be counted separately. The statute of limitations should be stopped if the accused is evading the investigation for the court trial. In this situation, the limitation period should be resumed at the time of detaining the accused or his/her acknowledgement of guilt.

Preventive anti-corruption legislation 
UNCAC's Article 5 (Preventive anti-corruption policies and practices) requires member states to develop and implement or to maintain effective, coordinated anti-corruption policies. In the last 10 years, the Azerbaijani government has adopted five anti-corruption programs:
 State Program on Combating Corruption (2004–2006)
 National Strategy on Increasing Transparency and Fighting Against Corruption (2007–2011)
 National Anti-Corruption Action Plan (2012–2015)
 National Action Plan for Promoting Open Government (2012–2015)
 National Action Plan for Promoting Open Government (2016–2018)
All state programs and action plans were adopted with Presidential Decrees. In the state programs, key anti-corruption laws were adopted; the specialized ACAs began functioning; reforms were implemented in state institutions; and efficient cooperative relationships with CSOs were established. Azerbaijan has ratified all international documents on the fight against corruption. The implemented reforms have positively impacted on economic development, with Azerbaijan becoming a world leader in gross domestic product (GDP) during 2005–2006. As a result of the measures implemented to strengthen financial control, the state budget was dramatically increased.

Within Azerbaijan's national anti-corruption strategies, national legislation was brought into line with the requirements of international conventions on the fight against corruption. In addition, the Criminal Code and Criminal Procedure Code were amended to criminalize active/passive bribery, trading in influence, abuse of power and other corruption-related offences. These corruption offences were all included in the category of grave crimes. Furthermore, the new Law of 2014 on the Prevention of the Legalization of Criminally Obtained Funds or Other Property and the Financing of Terrorism was adopted and respective changes were made to the Criminal Code to criminalize money laundering and the financing of terrorism.

The Law of 2011 on Reviewing Citizens’ Appeals was amended to reduce the time taken in reviewing corruption-related appeals by state bodies and to receive and respond to appeals in electronic form.

One of the key preventive legislative Acts, the Law of 2005 on Access to Information was adopted on 5 December 2005. This law specified the scope of information that should be disclosed by state bodies and indicated the methods to be used for disclosing information and the types of information to be disclosed. In addition, it required state bodies to designate responsible structures or public officials to provide information regarding the work of state bodies. More than 30 laws were amended to satisfy the implementation of this law. The electronic database of Azerbaijan's national legislation was established and made publicly available.

The Law of 2007 on Rules of Ethics Conduct of Civil Servants was adopted as were ethics codes for the sectors of prosecutors, judges and employees of the Ministries of Customs and Taxes. This law provided 15 ethics conduct rules including rules: on gifts; impermissibility of acquiring material and non-material gifts, privileges and concessions; prevention of corruption; prevention of conflict of interest; and use of information and property.

Article 13 (Prevention of corruption) of the Law of 2007 on Rules of Ethics Conduct of Civil Servants indicates that a civil servant shall refuse any offered illegal material/non-material gifts or privileges. In the case that those gifts and privileges are given for reasons not depending on the actions of the civil servant, he/she should disclose them to the head of the state body and must return those benefits to the state body.

Article 14 (Prohibition on accepting gifts) of this law provides that the civil servant shall not demand or accept any gift which may influence his/her work. However, a civil servant can accept the gift as a sign of hospitality but this should not exceed the value of €30. If a civil servant is not sure whether he/she should accept the gift, he/she must consult with his/her immediate supervisor.

See also 
Azerbaijani laundromat
 ASAN service
 Commission on Combating Corruption
 Open government in Azerbaijan
 Azerbaijan Anti-Corruption Academy

References

 
Corruption by country
Corruption in Asia
Corruption in Europe
Corruption